The 2001 Colortex Budapest Grand Prix was a women's tennis tournament played on outdoor clay courts in Budapest, Hungary and was part of Tier V of the 2001 WTA Tour. It was the seventh edition of the tournament and ran from 16 April until 22 April 2001. First-seeded Magdalena Maleeva won the singles title and earned $16,000 first-prize money.

Finals

Singles

 Magdalena Maleeva defeated  Anne Kremer 3–6, 6–2, 6–4
 It was Maleeva's only singles title of the year and the 8th of her career.

Doubles

 Tathiana Garbin /  Janette Husárová defeated  Zsófia Gubacsi /  Dragana Zarić 6–1, 6–3
 It was Garbin's 2nd title of the year and the 4th of her career. It was Husárová's 3rd title of the year and the 8th of her career.

External links
 ITF tournament edition details
 Tournament draws

Colortex Budapest Grand Prix
Budapest Grand Prix
Buda
Buda